Vadim Kirillov  (born 9 September 1964) is a former Soviet football player and coach.

Career
Kirillov played professional football for FC Spartak Moscow and FC Lokomotiv Moscow in the Soviet Union. He made seven appearances as goalkeeper for Lokomotiv Moscow in the Soviet First League during the 1983 season.

He was the goalkeeping coach for Columbus Crew of Major League Soccer from 2007-2011. He joined the New York Red Bulls Academy in February 2013. In March 2015 he joined New York Red Bulls II as Goalkeeper coach.

References

External links
redbullsacademy.com

1964 births
Living people
Soviet footballers
FC Spartak Moscow players
FC Lokomotiv Moscow players
Columbus Crew non-playing staff
New York Red Bulls non-playing staff
Association football goalkeepers
USL Championship coaches
New York Red Bulls II coaches
Russian expatriate sportspeople in the United States
Association football goalkeeping coaches